Brayton is a city in Audubon County, Iowa, United States, along the East Nishnabotna River. The population was 143 at the 2020 census.

History
Brayton was laid out in 1878. Brayton was the name of a railroad employee. The first school was opened in Brayton in 1896.

Geography
Brayton is located at  (41.545283, -94.925865).

Demographics

2010 census
As of the census of 2010, there were 128 people, 62 households, and 33 families residing in the city. The racial makeup of the city was 98.4% White and 1.6% from two or more races. Hispanic or Latino of any race were 0.8% of the population.

There were 62 households, of which 21.0% had children under the age of 18 living with them, 45.2% were married couples living together, 4.8% had a female householder with no husband present, 3.2% had a male householder with no wife present, and 46.8% were non-families. 40.3% of all households were made up of individuals, and 14.5% had someone living alone who was 65 years of age or older. The average household size was 2.06 and the average family size was 2.79.

The median age in the city was 43 years. 20.3% of residents were under the age of 18; 8.7% were between the ages of 18 and 24; 24.2% were from 25 to 44; 25.9% were from 45 to 64; and 21.1% were 65 years of age or older. The gender makeup of the city was 53.1% male and 46.9% female.

2000 census
As of the census of 2000, there were 145 people, 67 households, and 43 families residing in the city. The racial makeup of the city was 99.31% White and 0.69% Native American.

There were 67 households, out of which 20.9% had children under the age of 18 living with them, 56.7% were married couples living together, 6.0% had a female householder with no husband present, and 35.8% were non-families. 29.9% of all households were made up of individuals, and 19.4% had someone living alone who was 65 years of age or older. The average household size was 2.16 and the average family size was 2.65.

In the city, the population was spread out, with 19.3% under the age of 18, 8.3% from 18 to 24, 20.7% from 25 to 44, 17.9% from 45 to 64, and 33.8% who were 65 years of age or older. The median age was 46 years. For every 100 females, there were 101.4 males. For every 100 females age 18 and over, there were 95.0 males.

The median income for a household in the city was $25,875, and the median income for a family was $25,625. Males had a median income of $30,833 versus $15,833 for females. The per capita income for the city was $12,166. There were none of the families and 3.9% of the population living below the poverty line, including no under eighteens and 1.8% of those over 64.

Education
It is served by the Exira–Elk Horn–Kimballton Community School District.

Brayton schools consolidated into the Exira Community School District around the late 1950s or early 1960s. On July 1, 2014, the Exira district consolidated with the Elk Horn–Kimballton Community School District to form the Exira–Elk Horn–Kimballton district.

See also
T-Bone Trail

References

Cities in Audubon County, Iowa
Cities in Iowa
1878 establishments in Iowa
Populated places established in 1878